The Dug Springs Station Site is a former way station on the Overland Trail in Sweetwater County, Wyoming. Constructed about 1862, the station was built with rock slab walls, between Laclede Station and Duck Lake Station. The site was placed on the National Register of Historic Places on December 6, 1978.

References

External links
 Dug Springs Station Site at the Wyoming State Historic Preservation Office

National Register of Historic Places in Sweetwater County, Wyoming
Overland Trail
Stagecoach stations on the National Register of Historic Places in Wyoming